Neuhausen Badischer Bahnhof (sometimes abbreviated as Neuhausen Bad Bf) is one of three railway stations in the municipality of Neuhausen am Rheinfall (the others being  and ).

Location
Despite it being situated in Switzerland, the station is located on the High Rhine Railway of the German Deutsche Bahn (DB) that crosses the Swiss-German border several times on its route between Basel and Singen. The station is operated by the DB.

Services
 the following services stop at Neuhausen Badischer Bahnhof:

At peak times on working days there are additional quarterly-hour services running between Beringen Badischer Bahnhof and Schaffhausen, calling at Beringerfeld and Neuhausen Badischer Bahnhof.

References

External links

Railway stations in the canton of Schaffhausen
Neuhausen am Rheinfall
Railway stations in Switzerland opened in 1863